Step into the Light may refer to:
 Step into the Light (album), a 1985 album by Patty Larkin
 "Step into the Light" (Darren Hayes song)
 "Step into the Light" (Myra song)
 "Step into the Light", a song on the 1996 album Black Love (The Afghan Whigs album)